Tenellus leporhinus is a species of thorny catfish native to Brazil, Guyana and Venezuela where it is found in the Orinoco, Branco and Essequibo River basina.  This species grows to a length of  SL.

References 

Doradidae
Fish of South America
Fish of Brazil
Taxa named by Carl H. Eigenmann
Fish described in 1912